Orlando Pereira (22 January 1949 – 4 September 1999), known as Orlando Lelé as a player and Orlando Amarelo as a manager, or simply Orlando, was a Brazilian retired footballer and manager. He played as a right back.

Honours

Player
Coritiba
Campeonato Paraense: 1983

Vasco da Gama
Campeonato Carioca: 1987

Manager
Goiatuba
Campeonato Goiano: 1992

References

External links

Futebol de Goyaz profile 

1949 births
1999 deaths
Sportspeople from Santos, São Paulo
Brazilian footballers
Association football defenders
Campeonato Brasileiro Série A players
Santos FC players
Coritiba Foot Ball Club players
America Football Club (RJ) players
CR Vasco da Gama players
Serie A players
Udinese Calcio players
Brazil international footballers
Brazilian expatriate footballers
Brazilian expatriate sportspeople in Italy
Expatriate footballers in Italy
Brazilian football managers
Campeonato Brasileiro Série A managers
Sociedade Esportiva do Gama managers
Atlético Clube Goianiense managers
Goiás Esporte Clube managers
Santos FC managers
Vila Nova Futebol Clube managers